Tommy Ritchie ( 10 July 1930 - November 2017) was a Northern Irish professional footballer who played as an inside forward.

References

1930 births
People from Bangor, County Down
Association footballers from Northern Ireland
Association football inside forwards
Bangor F.C. players
Manchester United F.C. players
Reading F.C. players
Bedford Town F.C. players
Dartford F.C. players
Grimsby Town F.C. players
Barrow A.F.C. players
Guildford City F.C. players
English Football League players
2017 deaths